Letters from My Windmill is a 1954 French comedy-drama film directed by Marcel Pagnol, starring Rellys, Robert Vattier, Fernand Sardou and Édouard Delmont. Set in the countryside of Provence, the film is based on three tales from Alphonse Daudet's 1869 short story collection Letters from My Windmill: "The Three Low Masses", "The Elixir of Father Gaucher" and "The Secret of Master Cornille". It premiered on 5 November 1954 and had 2,399,645 admissions in France.

In 1968 Pagnol made a television film based on another story from the same collection, Le curé de Cucugnan. Roger Crouzet was hired again and reprised his role as Daudet from Letters from My Windmill.

Cast
Prologue
 Henri Crémieux as Honarat Grapazzi
 Roger Crouzet as Alphonse Daudet
 Cambis as Seguin
"The Three Low Masses"
 Henri Vilbert as Dom Balaguere
 Marcel Daxely as Garrigou
 Yvonne Gamy as The Old Woman
 Keller as The Marquis
 René Sarvil as The Chef
"The Elixir of Father Gaucher"
 Rellys as Father Gaucher
 Robert Vattier as The Abbot
 Christian Lude as Father Sylvestre
 Fernand Sardou as M. Charnigue, apothecary
"The Secret of Master Cornille"
 Édouard Delmont as Master Cornille
 Roger Crouzet as Alphonse Daudet
 Pierrette Bruno as Vivette

Critical reception
Bosley Crowther of The New York Times wrote: "Like everything done by M. Pagnol, this collection of three little tales is full of the meat of human characters and the wine of the land from which they spring. It is spiced with the sharp and earthy humor that M. Pagnol has distilled from his long association with the Frenchmen who draw their life from her bare and rolling hills. And because of the way he shoots his pictures, in the buildings, streets and country of Provence, it has an air of authenticity about it that makes one feel an immediate participant in his scenes."

Brett Bowles, an Associate Professor of French at Indiana University, called it "incongruously burlesque."

References

External links
 Letters from My Windmill at marcel-pagnol.com

1954 comedy-drama films
1954 films
Films based on short fiction
Films based on works by Alphonse Daudet
Films directed by Marcel Pagnol
Films set in France
Films shot in France
French comedy-drama films
1950s French-language films
1950s French films